Sankarpur may refer to the following places:

Sankarpur, Paschim Bardhaman, West Bengal, India
Sankarpur, Sarlahi, Janakpur Zone, Nepal
Sankarpur, Darchula, Mahakali Zone, Nepal
Sankarpur, Kanchanpur, Mahakali Zone, Nepal